The year 1693 in music involved some significant events.

Events
Georg Philipp Telemann is sent to school in Zellerfeld, in the hope that it will put him off a musical career.
John Eccles becomes resident composer at Drury Lane theatre.

Published popular music

Classical music

 Heinrich Ignaz Franz von Biber – 
 Antonio Caldara – 12 Trio Sonatas, Op.1
Marc-Antoine Charpentier 
Antiennes O de l'Avent, H.36-43
Prélude pour Magnificat, H.533
Noël sur les instruments, H.534
 Philipp Heinrich Erlebach – 6 Ouvertures
Johann Jakob Froberger – Diverse curiose partite
 Johann Philipp Krieger – 12 Sonatas, Op. 2
 Carlo Antonio Marino – 12 Sonatas, Op. 3
 Johann Pachelbel 
 Erster Theil etlicher Choräle
 Dies sind die heil'gen zehn Gebot''', P.50a
 Henry Purcell  
 O Give Thanks unto the Lord, Z.33
 Celebrate this Festival, Z.321 (Ode for Queen Mary's birthday)
Alessandro Scarlatti – Giuditta, R.500.9
 Giuseppe Torelli – Sinfonia in D major, G.4

Opera
Marc-Antoine Charpentier – MédéeHenri Desmarets – DidonBirths
January 28 – Gregor Werner, composer (died 1766)
August 8 – Laurent Belissen, composer (died 1762)
October 28 – Šimon Brixi, composer (died 1735)date unknown – Lodovico Filippo Laurenti, composer (died 1757)

Deaths
August 28 – Johann Christoph Bach, court musician (b. 1645)
September – Pavel Josef Vejvanovský, composer (b. c.1633)date unknown'' – Johann Caspar Kerll, composer (born 1627)

 
17th century in music
Music by year